Polistes crinitus is a species of paper wasp most commonly found on Hispaniola, Jamaica and other small Caribbean islands. Subspecies of P. crinitus include Polistes crinitus crinitus, Polistes crinitus americanus, and Polistes crinitus multicolor.

References 

crinitus
Insects described in 1765